Veaceslav Posmac (born 7 November 1990) is a Moldovan footballer who plays as a centre-back for Turkish club Boluspor.

Club career
In June 2017, Posmac moved to FC Sheriff Tiraspol. He made his league debut for the club on 9 July 2017 in a 5–0 home victory over FC Zaria Bălți. This game also marked his first league goal for the club, which was scored in the 72nd minute. In January 2019, Posmac was voted FC Sheriff Fan's Player of the Season. On 12 July 2021, he signed for TFF First League club Tuzlaspor.

International career
Posmac made his senior international debut on 14 June 2013 in a 2–1 friendly victory over Kyrgyzstan.

Career statistics

International
As of 20 August 2021

Scores and results list Moldova's goal tally first.

Honours
Sheriff Tiraspol
Moldovan National Division: 2017, 2018, 2019, 2020–21
Moldovan Cup: 2018–19

References

1990 births
Footballers from Chișinău
Living people
Moldovan footballers
Moldova international footballers
Association football defenders
FC Sfîntul Gheorghe players
FC Dacia Chișinău players
FC Sheriff Tiraspol players
Tuzlaspor players
FC Zimbru Chișinău players
Boluspor footballers
Moldovan Super Liga players
TFF First League players
Moldovan expatriate footballers
Expatriate footballers in Turkey
Moldovan expatriate sportspeople in Turkey